Boni Avenue is a major east–west thoroughfare in Mandaluyong, eastern Metro Manila, Philippines. It is a six-lane divided avenue that runs from Aglipay Street to Epifanio de los Santos Avenue (EDSA). After crossing EDSA via the EDSA-Boni tunnel, the road continues as Pioneer Street towards Pasig. The avenue is named after the nickname of Bonifacio Javier, a decorated guerrilla leader during World War II and former mayor of Mandaluyong.

Route description

The avenue commences at the junction with Rev. Aglipay Street in the city's old downtown area (poblacíon), where the Cathedral of the Holy Child (Aglipay Church) and San Felipe Neri Church (Roman Catholic Church) are located. It heads southeasterly traversing the barangays of Old and New Zañiga and San José, and crossing Primo Cruz Street before coming to a large roundabout called Maysilo Circle in Plainview. At this roundabout which houses the Mandaluyong City Hall complex and the Archdiocesan Shrine of the Divine Mercy, Boni intersects with F. Martinez Avenue and San Francisco Street. It curves northeast past Maysilo Circle as it approaches a commercial district at Barangka Drive. East of Barangka, the avenue becomes more commercial with several retail outlets and condominium developments lining this section of Boni where the Rizal Technological University is also situated. The avenue ends at the junction with EDSA, near Boni station of the Manila MRT-3.

Landmarks

 Archdiocesan Shrine of the Divine Mercy
 Club Mwah
 Dansalan Gardens
 Mandaluyong City Hall
 Mandaluyong City Medical Center
 Maysilo Circle
 New Horizon Hotel Manila
 Rizal Technological University
 Robinsons Cybergate
 San Felipe Neri Catholic Cemetery
 San Felipe Neri Church
 San Felipe Neri Parochial School
 San Francisco Gardens

References

Streets in Metro Manila